Hyndburn  is a local government district with borough status in Lancashire, England. Its council is based in Accrington and covers the outlying towns of Clayton-le-Moors, Great Harwood, Oswaldtwistle and Rishton. The borough was created in 1974 and takes its name from the River Hyndburn. It had a population of 80,734 at the 2011 Census. Elections to the council are held in three out of every four years, with one third of the 35 seats on the council being elected at each election. Both the Conservative and Labour parties have controlled the council at different times, as well as periods when no party has had a majority.

History
The district was created on 1 April 1974 under the Local Government Act 1972, as a non-metropolitan district covering the territory of six former districts, which were abolished at the same time, plus a single parish from a seventh district:
Accrington Municipal Borough
Altham parish from Burnley Rural District
Church Urban District
Clayton-le-Moors Urban District
Great Harwood Urban District
Oswaldtwistle Urban District
Rishton Urban District

The new district was given the name Hyndburn, taken from the River Hyndburn which passes through the district. The new district was awarded borough status on the day that it came into being, allowing the chairman of the council to take the title of mayor.

In 2007, the council proposed changing the name from Hyndburn to "Accrington and Districts", to aid recognition of the borough by those not familiar with the area. After a public consultation, the change of name did not go ahead.

Council

Elections are generally held three years out of every four, with a third of the council elected each time. In the fourth year when there are no borough council elections, elections are held instead for Lancashire County Council as the area's higher tier authority. Since the last election to the borough council in 2022, the council has been under no overall control. The leader of the council since 2011 has been Miles Parkinson, who was a member of the Labour Party when appointed leader in 2011, but left the party to become an independent in March 2022, whilst remaining leader. The next election is due in May 2023.

The role of mayor is largely ceremonial, usually being held by a different councillor each year. The mayor for the 2022/2023 municipal year is Labour councillor Abdul Khan, who represents the Central ward.

In March 2010, Hyndburn was voted the 10th best council in The Times "Best Public Sector Places to Work". The borough also made it to The Times Best Companies Guide.

Premises

The council's main offices are at Scaitcliffe House on Ormerod Street in Accrington, being part of a converted textile mill. The council moved there in 2002. Full council meetings are usually held at Accrington Town Hall.

Education
There are approximately nine state secondary schools in Hyndburn. These include The Hyndburn Academy, St Christopher's Church of England High School, Accrington Academy, Rhyddings, Mount Carmel Roman Catholic High School, The Hollins, along with Broadfield Specialist School, and North Cliffe School.

The percentage of pupils achieving 5 or more GCSEs at grades A*-C has increased from 43.7% in 2001 up to 75.9% in 2011. Absences dropped from 12,052 in 2006 to 9,545 in 2011, mainly due to schools competing.

Geography
The district is polycentric and is located between the larger settlements of Blackburn and Burnley. It is linked to both areas by the M65 motorway and the East Lancashire railway line.

The borough had a population of 80,734 at the 2011 census. Much of the borough forms part of the Accrington/Rossendale Built-up area as defined by the Office for National Statistics, which covers the borough and parts of the neighbouring borough of Rossendale. The Acrrington/Rossendale built-up area extends from the town of Accrington to Rawtenstall and Bacup, taking in parts of the boroughs of Hyndburn and Rossendale. The Accrington/Rossendale built-up area was recorded at having a population of 125,059 at the 2011 census.

Places in Hyndburn

Accrington
Altham
Baxenden
Belthorn (part)
Church
Clayton-le-Moors
Great Harwood
Huncoat
Knuzden (considered a suburb of Blackburn)
Oswaldtwistle
Rishton
Tottleworth
Whitebirk (part) (considered a suburb of Blackburn)

Civil parishes
Altham is the only civil parish in Hyndburn.

Councillors

Neighbouring districts

Freedom of the Borough
The following people and military units have received the Freedom of the Borough of Hyndburn.

Individuals
 Ronald Hill : 10 July 2012.
 Julie Hesmondhalgh: 28 January 2015.
 David Lloyd: 6 July 2018.
 Councillor Bernard Dawson: 6 July 2018.

Military Units
 The Queen's Lancashire Regiment: 29 June 2002.

References

External links

Accrington Web Hyndburn's local community forum
Civic Arts Centre Listings for what's on at the Civic Arts Centre

 
Local government in Hyndburn
Non-metropolitan districts of Lancashire
Boroughs in England